Timocratica venifurcata is a moth in the family Depressariidae. It was described by Vitor O. Becker in 1982. It is found in the Federal District of Brazil.

The wingspan is 16–17 mm.

References

Moths described in 1982
Timocratica
Taxa named by Vitor Becker